This is a list of equipment of the Greek/ Hellenic Armed Forces during World War II. This list does not include weapons used by the Greek resistance during the occupation of Greece.

Land weapons 
 List of World War II weapons of Greece

Aircraft 
 List of aircraft of Greece in World War II

References

 
Greece